Domonkos is a Hungarian surname.

Notable people with this surname include:
 Domonkos Ferjancsik (born 1975), Hungarian fencer
 László Domonkos (1886–1956), Hungarian footballer
 Mariann Domonkos (born 1958), Hungarian table tennis player
 Pál Domonkos (1908–1964), Hungarian rower
 Domonkos Széll (born 1989), Hungarian rower

See also
 Domonkos I, Archbishop of Esztergom
 Domonkos II, Archbishop of Esztergom